Chicken Party is a 2003 short film directed by Tate Taylor.

Cast
Octavia Spencer as Laqueta Mills
Allison Janney as Barbara Strasser 
Tate Taylor as Luke Smith
Melissa McCarthy as Tot Wagner

Production
Chicken Party was filmed in Los Angeles, California.

Reception
Chicken Party won five awards:

 Jackson Crossroads Film Festival (2004) -in Best Short nomination
 Palm Beach International Film Festival (2004) - Best Short 
 Palm Springs International ShortFest (2004) - Best Live Action  
 Sarasota Film Festival (2004) - Best Short  
 WorldFest Houston (2004) - Independent Short Subject-Films & Video - Comedy-Original.

References

External links
 

2003 films
American short films
Films directed by Tate Taylor
2000s English-language films